Pieter ("Piet") Karel de Zwarte (born 16 February 1948 in Renkum) is a former Dutch water polo player, who won the bronze medal with the Dutch Men's Team at the 1976 Summer Olympics in Montreal, Quebec, Canada.

See also
 List of Olympic medalists in water polo (men)

External links
 

1948 births
Living people
Dutch male water polo players
Olympic bronze medalists for the Netherlands in water polo
Water polo players at the 1976 Summer Olympics
People from Renkum
Sportspeople from Gelderland
Medalists at the 1976 Summer Olympics
20th-century Dutch people